SM U-69 was a Type U 66 submarine or U-boat for the German Imperial Navy during the First World War. She had been laid down in February 1914 as U-10 the fourth boat of the U-7 class for the Austro-Hungarian Navy ( or ) but was sold to Germany, along with the others in her class, in November 1914.

The submarine was ordered as U-10 from Germaniawerft of Kiel as the first of five boats of the U-7 class for the Austro-Hungarian Navy. After the outbreak of World War I in August 1914, the Austro-Hungarian Navy became convinced that none of the submarines of the class could be delivered to the Adriatic via Gibraltar. As a consequence, the entire class, including U-10, was sold to the German Imperial Navy in November 1914. Under German control, the class became known as the U 66 type and the boats were renumbered; U-10 became U-69, and all were redesigned and reconstructed to German specifications. U-69 was launched in June 1915 and commissioned in September.

As a part of the 4th Flotilla, U-69 sank 31 ships with a combined gross register tonnage of 102,875 in five war patrols. U-69 left Emden on her sixth patrol on 9 July 1917 for operations off Ireland. On 11 July, U-69 reported her position off Norway but neither she nor any of her crew were ever heard from again. British records say that U-69 was sunk by destroyer  on 12 July, but a German postwar study cast doubt on this. U-69s fate is officially unknown.

Design and construction 
After the Austro-Hungarian Navy had competitively evaluated three foreign submarine designs, it selected the Germaniawerft 506d design, also known as the Type UD, for its new U-7 class  of five submarines. The Navy ordered five boats on 1 February 1913.

The U-7 class was seen by the Austro-Hungarian Navy as an improved version of its U-3 class, which was also a Germaniawerft design. As designed for the Austro-Hungarian Navy, the boats were to displace  on the surface and  while submerged. The boats were designed with five  torpedo tubes; four located in the bow, one in the stern. The boats' armament was to also include a single  deck gun.

U-10 was laid down on 7 February 1914, and her construction was slated to be complete within 29 to 33 months.

Neither U-10 nor any of her sister boats were complete when World War I began in August 1914. With the boats under construction at Kiel, the Austrians became convinced that it would be impossible to take delivery of the boats, which would need to be towed into the Mediterranean past Gibraltar, a British territory. As a result, U-10 and her four sisters were sold to the Imperial German Navy on 28 November 1914.

U-10 was renumbered by the Germans as U-69 when her class was redesignated as the Type U 66. The torpedo load was increased by a third, from 9 to 12, and the deck gun was upgraded from the  gun originally specified to an  Uk L/30 one.

Service career 
U-69 was launched on 24 June 1915. On 4 September, SM U-69 was commissioned into the Imperial German Navy under the command of Kapitänleutnant Ernst Wilhelms. On 4 March 1916, U-69 was assigned to the IV. U-Halbflotille.

U-69s most successful month for number of ships sunk was April 1916, when she sank eight ships of 21,051 GRT in a span of six days. The month with the highest tonnage sunk was June 1917 when she sank five ships of 29,808 GRT in a nine-day span; nearly half of that total came from one ship, the 13,441 GRT British armed merchant cruiser  sunk on 14 June. Avenger had been patrolling off the Shetland Islands and was returning to Scapa Flow, when she was struck by a single torpedo on the port side. The ship began listing heavily and non-essential crew were evacuated while destroyers arrived and took her under tow. Despite strenuous efforts to save her, Avenger foundered ten hours after being hit when her internal bulkheads collapsed. One man was killed in the attack.

U-69 began her sixth and final patrol on 9 July when she departed from Emden, destined for operations off Ireland. According to author Dwight Messimer, two British sources report that  sank U-69 at position  on 12 July. An observer in a kite balloon deployed by Patriot spotted a surfaced U-boat at 07:00. The U-boat submerged and Patriot hunted the submarine until noon, when it loosed two depth charges that brought thick brown oil to the surface. A postwar study by Germany cast doubt on whether or not the submarine attacked by Patriot was U-69. Officially, her fate remains unknown.

Summary of raiding history

Notes

References

Bibliography

External links

Photos of cruises of German submarine U-54 in 1916-1918.
A 44 min. German film from 1917 about a cruise of the German submarine U-35.
Room 40:  original documents, photos and maps about World War I German submarine warfare and British Room 40 Intelligence from The National Archives, Kew, Richmond, UK.

German Type U 66 submarines
U-boats commissioned in 1915
Maritime incidents in 1917
U-boats sunk in 1917
World War I submarines of Germany
World War I shipwrecks in the Atlantic Ocean
1915 ships
Ships built in Kiel
Missing U-boats of World War I